The men's discus throw at the 2010 European Athletics Championships was held at the Estadi Olímpic Lluís Companys on 31 July and 1 August.

Medalists

Records

Schedule

Results

Qualification
Qualification: Qualification Performance 63.50 (Q) or at least 12 best performers advance to the final

Final

References
 Qualification Results
 Final Results
 Results European Championships Athletic 1934-2010 
Full results

Discus throw
Discus throw at the European Athletics Championships